The NT Indigenous Music Awards 2005 is the 2nd annual National Indigenous Music Awards, established by MusicNT.

The awards ceremony was held on 27 August 2005.

Performers
The Mills Family
George Rrurrambu
Letterstick Band 
Shellie Morris
Mandy Garling and Jessica Mauboy
Geoffrey Gurrumul Yunupingu
Herbie Laughton, Gus Williams and Auriel Andrews

Hall of Fame Inductee 
 The Mystics, David and Kathy Mills Herbie Laughton, Gus Williams, Auriel Andrew, Dick Mununggu, Mr. Yamma Snr

Outstanding Contribution to Music Awards 
CAAMA Music and The Letterstick Band

Awards
Male Artist of the Year

Female Artist of the Year

Band of the Year

Best Emerging Artist of the Year

Best Music Release

Song of the Year

Most Popular Song Award

People's Choice Award

Best Cover Art

Traditional Music Award

References

2005 in Australian music
2005 music awards
National Indigenous Music Awards